"The Irish Washerwoman" is a traditional jig known to have been played throughout Britain and Ireland and in North America. Although usually considered an Irish tune, some scholars claim that it is English in origin, derived from the seventeenth-century tune "Dargason".

This jig was incorporated as the first movement of the Irish Suite, a collection of traditional tunes arranged for orchestra by American composer Leroy Anderson in 1946.

Over the years many songs have used The Irish Washerwoman tune. One of the most popularly known lyrics sung to the tune is McTavish Is Dead.

In popular culture
The song has been used in many movies, such as Christmas in Connecticut and Master and Commander: The Far Side of the World. 
In the Little House on the Prairie book series, Pa Ingalls plays the song on his fiddle.

The Dutch group The Jumping Jewels recorded a version which reached No. 9 on the Dutch Charts.

References

External links
A clip of John Sheahan and André Rieu playing the jig on violins
A site with lyrics
Sheet music on thesession.org
Sheet music for piano – intermediate level 4, with sound recording.
The Chemist's Drinking Song
The Old Irish Washerwoman Feature film.
Irish Washerwoman as collected from Stephen Baldwin, Gloucestershire fiddler, with sound recording.
Louis-Antoine Jullien used the tune in his "The Royal Irish Quadrilles".

Irish songs
Songs about Ireland
Year of song unknown